A crocodile is a component of train protection systems used in France and Belgium. It works similarly to the Automatic Warning System (AWS) used in the United Kingdom.

Communication between the ground-based signalling system and the in-cab equipment is made by the crocodile, an electrical contact placed between the rails and a metallic brush mounted beneath the locomotive cab. It is distinctively French, originating on the Chemins de Fer du Nord around 1872, spreading throughout France and penetrating into Belgium and Luxembourg after 1900. It was intended principally to provide evidence of the alertness of the driver, not to act to control a train automatically.

The crocodile is an invention of the engineers Lartigue and Forest. Originally it was placed 100–200 metres in front of a distant signal, usually a red disc of "deferred stop".  When recording of cab signals was introduced, the device was moved closer to the signal, most often directly opposite it, to reduce the chance of a change of the signal between the time the locomotive passed over the crocodile and when the locomotive actually passed the signal. If a signal changed suddenly to a caution or danger aspect in the face of the driver, it would appear that he had not noticed it and had been surprised, when that was not the case.

The crocodile can provide two different pieces of information to the driver, according to the aspect of the corresponding signal:
 The "Répétition Signal Fermé" (which literally means "repetition of closed signal"), corresponding to a caution  or danger signal, applies a +20 V voltage to the crocodile, causing a warning horn to beep in the driver's cab. Then, unless the driver pushes the acknowledgement button within five seconds, the emergency brakes are applied automatically.
 The "Répétition Signal Ouvert" (which literally means "repetition of opened signal"), corresponding to a proceed signal, applies a -20 V voltage to the crocodile, causing a bell to ring in the driver's cab.

References 

Train protection systems